Mother/Android is a 2021 American post-apocalyptic science fiction thriller film, written and directed by Mattson Tomlin for his feature directorial debut, and starring Chloë Grace Moretz, Algee Smith, and Raúl Castillo. The film tells the story of a pregnant woman and her boyfriend who try to reach a fortified Boston amidst an AI takeover. It was released on December 17, 2021, on Hulu.

Plot
On Christmas Eve at some point in the future, Georgia Olsen finds out that she is pregnant. The child's father, her boyfriend, Sam Hoth, asks her to marry him. Georgia, however, is uncertain both about the relationship and her desire to be a mother. She decides not to tell her parents.

Forgetting her phone at home, Georgia goes to a college Christmas party with Sam. An android named Eli, owned by the Olsens, wishes Sam happy Halloween instead of Christmas, the first suggestion that something is amiss.

At the party, a shrill screech can suddenly be heard and soon after, an android turns violent. He attacks Georgia and Sam, who run away from the house. Smartphones unexpectedly start exploding, killing their users and leading to an AI takeover.

Nine months later, Georgia, expecting her baby, has taken shelter in the forest with Sam. The couple are trying to get to a fortified Boston. They have heard rumors about a boat that is transporting new mothers to Asia, where they can find a peaceful life.

They avoid all roads and travel through the woods, until they reach a military camp. While Georgia gets examined by a doctor, Sam tries to find out how to reach Boston. At night, he gets into a fight with one of the soldiers, and he and Georgia are expelled from the camp the next day. They continue on, until they find an abandoned house, where they spend the night. Sam finds a dirt bike and repairs it.

The following day, the couple are able to travel faster on the dirt bike. While stopped at a river, they are spotted by an android, who pursues them. Soon, several more androids give chase, accompanied by drones. Sam drops off Georgia and tries to lure the androids away on the bike. Meanwhile, Georgia meets a camouflaged man who offers to help her. He turns out to be an AI programmer who tells her that the androids have learned to hack their software. He introduces himself as Arthur.

In the morning, Georgia awakes to contractions. She tells Arthur that she needs to find Sam, and he leads her to where her partner is being held. They approach a building patrolled by androids, from which cries of pain can be heard. Arthur gives Georgia a camouflaged vest, which he claims will conceal her. She walks through the building, looking for Sam, unseen by the androids. She finds him in one of the rooms, with his legs badly broken. While she is freeing Sam, another prisoner tries to draw the attention of the androids. Georgia drags Sam out into a large garage. She collapses from contractions, and just as they are about to be apprehended, Arthur intervenes, stabbing an android and saving them. Georgia goes into labor in Arthur's truck. She wakes up in a hospital clinic, with Sam beside her. A nurse informs her that the C-section delivery went well, and that they have a baby boy. The couple name their son Forest, and Sam takes a photo of the family.

Later, Georgia gets questioned by a security officer. She tells him what she and Sam have been through, and mentions the vest. The officer tells her that such camouflage technology does not exist. Georgia then realizes that Arthur is an android and that he deceived her. Within moments, the power goes out, and the base comes under attack. Georgia tries to wake up Sam, to no avail. She heads down to try and activate the base perimeter EMP and is confronted by Arthur. She shoots him in the face repeatedly, killing him. She manages to activate the EMP and returns to Sam.

When Georgia wakes up again, Sam is awake. Together with Forest, they head to the harbor, where officers are loading a boat headed to Korea. They are only able to take Forest, as Georgia and a legless Sam would be a burden. After pleading with them to no avail, Georgia is convinced by Sam to let Forest go and have a better life. She then boards a military convoy to Portland alone, while Sam is implied to have died of his injuries.

Cast and characters

Production
In September 2020, Chloë Grace Moretz, Algee Smith, and Raúl Castillo joined the cast of the film, with Mattson Tomlin directing from a screenplay he wrote, with Matt Reeves and Bill Block set to produce the film under their 6th and Idaho Productions and Miramax banners, respectively.

Writing
A few years after graduating from film school, Tomlin struggled to write his first movie, until he decided to loosely focus on a very personal story, that of his own adoption. According to the writer, this become a personal love letter to his biological parents. In an interview with Collider, Tomlin says, "I was born in the aftermath of the Romanian revolution, and I thought I would change that to the robot revolution." This was to have a genre component in addition to his personal story.

Filming
Principal photography began in September 2020 and lasted until November, with the majority of the film being located in Massachusetts. The downtown area of Boston was used as the setting for the human colony, and the Lynn Woods Reservation was the location of the android stronghold.

Release
On March 10, 2021, Hulu acquired the U.S. distribution rights to the film. It was released on December 17, 2021. Netflix acquired the international streaming rights to the film and it was released in all other regions on January 7, 2022.

Reception
The review aggregator website Rotten Tomatoes sampled 38 critics and judged 32% of the reviews to be positive, with an average rating of 4.80/10. The website's critics' consensus reads: "Mother/Android transcends its budgetary limitations on a visual level -- unfortunately, this sci-fi drama is less successful on the storytelling front." Metacritic, which uses a weighted average, assigned Mother/Android a score of 43 out of 100, based on 12 critics, indicating "mixed or average reviews".

Lena Wilson of The New York Times commented that the movie "offers little in the way of world building", and that the reason behind the android uprising is vague and confusing. She mentioned that because of this, "It offers ample room for the film's strong emotional core, but can be hopelessly distracting." Micheal Ordoña of the Los Angeles Times agreed, saying that in order to fully enjoy the film, they would have to focus on the main characters' "relationship and their mission to get their coming baby to safety and let the details blur." He noted that though the story has an "emotional resonance" with the filmmakers, referencing the real-life situation it was based on, its execution was not "immediate or terrifying as one imagines".

References

External links
 
 
 

2021 films
2020s English-language films
2020s science fiction thriller films
American post-apocalyptic films
American science fiction thriller films
Android (robot) films
Films produced by Bill Block
Films produced by Matt Reeves
Films with screenplays by Mattson Tomlin
Hulu original films
Miramax films
2020s American films